The 1934 United States Senate election in Delaware took place on November 6, 1934. Incumbent Republican U.S. Senator John G. Townsend Jr. was re-elected to a second term in office over Democratic U.S. Representative Wilbur L. Adams.

General election

Candidates
Wilbur L. Adams, U.S. Representative at-large since 1933 (Democratic)
John G. Townsend Jr., incumbent Senator since 1929 (Republican)
Fred W. Whiteside (Socialist)
John T. Wlodkoski (Communist)

Results

See also 
 1934 United States Senate elections

References

Delaware
1934
1934 Delaware elections